George Andrew Plescia (born August 19, 1966) is a U.S. Republican politician from California. He served in the California State Assembly from 2002 and 2008, and served as its Minority Leader in 2006.

Career
Born in Sacramento, California, Plescia graduated from California State University, Sacramento. Plescia worked as an unpaid intern for former State Senator Bill Morrow in his district office, and eventually became a paid staff member of Morrow's staff. Plescia was elected to the California State Assembly in 2002 to represent the 75th Assembly District, which covers parts of northern San Diego County, California. For part of 2006, Plescia served as floor leader of the California State Assembly's Republican. In 2009, he was appointed by Governor Arnold Schwarzenegger to serve on the California Unemployment Insurance Appeals Board.

2012 State Senate campaign
Plescia ran against incumbent Democrat Marty Block to represent California's 39th district in the State Senate.  Block defeated Plescia 58.4% to 41.6% in the November general election. He took office on December 3, 2012.

During the campaign, Plescia generated controversy after running ads that accused Block of siding with teachers who sexually abused students. However, Block had actually voted against a procedural maneuver, not the bill itself. San Diego Assemblyman Nathan Fletcher, a former Republican, said that Plescia was "playing politics" with his accusation against Block.

San Diego CityBeat called Plescia's claims "despicable" and "disgusting." Although the U-T San Diego published an editorial criticizing Block for his vote, the newspaper also acknowledged that Block's vote was procedural.

Personal life
Plescia and his wife Melissa Dollaghan live in San Diego. He enjoys playing basketball and is a sports fan.

References

External links

 Official website

1966 births
California State University, Sacramento alumni
Republican Party members of the California State Assembly
Living people
21st-century American politicians